Soundbombing III is the third installment of the Rawkus Records Soundbombing series. The album was not nearly as critically acclaimed as its predecessor Soundbombing 2, but was able to sell moderately well, led by the single "The Life", featuring Styles P and Pharoahe Monch which was sent to radio during the week of April 29, 2002. Taking after 2000's Lyricist Lounge 2, Soundbombing III furthers the label's transition to a more commercial sound, which caused harsh criticisms from die-hard Rawkus fans. The album features Styles P, Pharoahe Monch, Mos Def, Skillz, Missy Elliott, Kool G Rap, Capone-N-Noreaga, Hi-Tek, Jonell, Method Man, Zap Mama, Talib Kweli, Common, Q-Tip, The Beatnuts, DJ Quik, Novel, The Roots, Cocoa Brovaz, Dawn Penn and R.A. the Rugged Man. The compilation is hosted by Cipha Sounds and Mr. Choc. The compilation contains many remixes of tracks already having appeared on earlier released albums, however the album does contain singles.

Track listing

Album chart positions

Singles chart positions

Albums produced by Ayatollah
2002 compilation albums
Hip hop compilation albums
Rawkus Records compilation albums
Albums produced by DJ Quik
Albums produced by Hi-Tek
Albums produced by Q-Tip (musician)
Sequel albums